"Emancipate Myself" is a song by Australian pop rock band Thirsty Merc. It was released as the second track from the band’s debut EP, First Work, and as the band's first official commercial single from their debut self-titled album, Thirsty Merc.  It achieved mainstream success, earning healthy radio airplay, and reaching number 37 on the Australian ARIA Singles Chart. The music video for "Emancipate Myself", which involved the band playing in a corporate office, wearing suits and ties, followed in the footsteps of its predecessor Wasting Time in garnering huge support.

Track listing
Australian CD single
 "Emancipate Myself"
 "Small Time Politics"
 "Lazy Susan" (live at Birdland Studios)

Charts

References

Thirsty Merc songs
2002 songs
Songs written by Phil Stack
Songs written by Rai Thistlethwayte
Warner Music Australasia singles